Mohd Yusof Ishak  (born 9 August 1981) is a Malaysian footballer who plays as goalkeeper. Yusof played for Perlis in the 2007 Malaysia Charity Shield, saving a penalty to beat Kedah and claim the cup. He was named  Man-of-the-match after the game ended.

References

Malaysian footballers
Living people
1981 births
Perlis FA players
Association football goalkeepers